Amaanaaiy is a 1998 Maldivian romantic drama film directed by Mahdi Ahmed. Produced by Mohamed Niyaz under Eternal Pictures, the film stars Ali Khalid, Fathimath Rameeza, Jamsheedha Ahmed and Iujaz Hafiz in pivotal roles. The film was released on 4 November 1998. The film revolves around a man who is welcomed with his illegitimate son after the child's mother's death and the events that proceed when his wife is not fond of the child.

The film is based on Shekhar Kapur's Indian drama film Masoom (1983) which is a remake of the 1982 Malayalam movie Olangal, which are both adaptations of Man, Woman and Child, 1980 novel by Erich Segal. However, the film majorly focuses on the character of Ashiya — played by Jamsheedha Ahmed — whose role has been derived as of Supriya Pathak's in Mausoom who only features for around five minutes.

Plot
Ashiya (Jamsheedha Ahmed), an eighteen years old was being trained as a teacher when she heard the news of her mother's death. Psychologically disturbed, she met a colleague, Mohamed Fairooz (Mohamed Hassan) and they initiate a romantic relationship. Despite her landlord's consent, Ashiya goes to an overnight trip with Fairooz. Fearing a tarnish reputation, her landlord threw her out of the house hence Ashiya and Fairooz moved in together. She was forced into prostitution by him. She completes her studies and flee to her island with the help of Bakuru (Abdul Sattar), her step father. She then starts working as a primary teacher in her island.

Zahid (Ali Khalid), a father of two girls — Neena and Nilfa — goes to S. Gan for an office work and stays at Bakuru's house since the return flight was delayed. There he meets Ashiya and a bond creates between them. They have a moment of intimacy and she gets pregnant from extramarital affairs. Zahid returns Male' and fifteen days later, she gets a letter from Zahid informing his wife's pregnancy. Fearing the news of pregnancy might ruin Zahid's marriage, Ashiya decides not to reveal it to him. She gives birth to a boy, Anil and he grew up unknown of his father's identity. When her son was nine years old, Ashiya dies of illness.

Afte Ashiya's death, Bakuru sends word to Zahid informing him that his son, needs a home. Zahid brings Anil home falsifying his identity in front of his wife Shafeeqa (Fathimath Rameeza). Similarly, Anil is never told that Zahid is his father as he bonds with Zahid and his daughters. On his friend's request, Zahid reveals Anil's identity to Shafeeqa who is devastated to learn of her husband's infidelity. Afterwards, she can't bear to look at him, a tangible reminder of Anil's betrayal. Shafeeqa has a hard time reconciling with Anil.

Anil, worried by the effect Anil is having on his family, decides to put him at Dhanaal; Anil accepts with reluctance. However, since it is holidays, 
Zahid returns Male' with Anil till re-opening of school. Eavesdropping an argument between Zahid and Shafeeqa, Anil figures out that Zahid is his father and runs away from home. Anil is reunited with Shafeeqa and Zahid at hospital where Anil confesses his awareness of the identity of his father to them. Shafeeqa is unable to bear his heartbreak and intercepts Anil before he departs to Addu to start education at Dhanaal, thereby accepting him into the family and wholeheartedly forgiving Zahid.

Cast 
 Ali Khalid as Zahid
 Fathimath Rameeza as Shafeeqa
 Jamsheedha Ahmed as Ashiya
 Iujaz Hafiz as Anil
 Abdul Sattar as Bakuru
 Mariyam Naisha as Neena
 Aminath Suzan as Nilfa
 Mohamed Hassan as Mohamed Fairooz
 Ibrahim Rasheed as Afeef
 Abdul Qadir as Haroon
 Ahmed Faisal as Amjad
 Khadheeja Moosa as Fareesha
 Sithi Fulhu as Sithi Fulhu
 Ravee Farooq as Fairooz's friend (Special appearance)
Aminath Rasheedha (Special appearance in picnic sequence)

Soundtrack

Accolades

References

External links 
 

1998 films
Maldivian romantic drama films
Remakes of Maldivian films
1998 romantic drama films
Dhivehi-language films